Lake Barlee is an intermittent salt lake.

Description

Lake Barlee and other lakes in the area are cenozoic palaeovalleys, fed predominantly by groundwater flowing through ancient palaeochannels. The channels are filled with calcretes and alluvial clay-quartz units.

Like most of the clay playas in the area, it is usually dry but can fill when tropical cyclones become rain-bearing depressions after they cross the coast. It fills about once every ten years on average, after which the water usually persists for another six to nine months. When it is inundated, it becomes an important breeding site for waterbirds.

Lake Barlee receives water from direct rainfall and inflow from a multitude of creeks. The bed of the lake is bare, with hundreds of greenstone rock islands of varying sizes. When the lake is nearly full or overflowing, at least five of the islands may support large numbers of breeding birds, particularly the banded stilt.

History
The traditional owners of the area are the Mantjintjarra Ngalia peoples, whose range extended from around Lake Wells in the east, to Lake Darlot and Lake Miranda in the west, to Cosmo Newberry through to Leonora and Lake Barlee up to Wiluna in the north.

Lake Barlee was named by John Forrest, who encountered it on 18 May 1869. Forrest's party, which was searching for the lost explorer Ludwig Leichhardt, became bogged while trying to cross the salt lake. After extracting their horses, they skirted the lake for nearly a week. On 25 May, Forrest climbed Yeedie Hill and saw the extent of the lake. Forrest named the lake after Frederick Barlee, the Colonial Secretary of Western Australia.

Birds
Lake Barlee, along with some small satellite lakes, was identified by BirdLife International as a  Important Bird Area (IBA). It supported one of the largest recorded breeding events of the banded stilt, with 179,000 nests counted.  Other waterbirds known to breed at the lake include the black swan, Australian shelduck, pink-eared duck, white-headed stilt, and red-capped plover.

Gallery

See also

 List of lakes of Western Australia

References

Barlee
Important Bird Areas of Western Australia
Barlee, Lake